The 1999 Canoe Slalom World Cup was a series of five races in 4 canoeing and kayaking categories organized by the International Canoe Federation (ICF). It was the 12th edition. The series consisted of 4 regular world cup races and the world cup final.

Calendar

Final standings 

The winner of each world cup race was awarded 30 points. The points scale reached down to 1 point for 20th place in the men's K1, while in the other three categories only the top 15 received points (with 6 points for 15th place). Only the best two results of each athlete from the first 4 world cups plus the result from the world cup final counted for the final world cup standings. Furthermore, an athlete or boat had to compete in the world cup final in order to be classified in the world cup rankings.

Results

World Cup Race 1

The first world cup race of the season took place at the Tacen Whitewater Course, Slovenia from 18 to 20 June.

World Cup Race 2

The second world cup race was originally scheduled to take place on June 25–27 in Skopje, Macedonia, but was eventually moved to Tacen due to political reasons. The race was held at the Tacen Whitewater Course from 22 to 24 June.

World Cup Race 3

The third world cup race of the season took place at the Čunovo Water Sports Centre, Slovakia from 13 to 15 August.

World Cup Race 4

The fourth world cup race of the season took place at the Augsburg Eiskanal, Germany from 20 to 22 August.

World Cup Final

The final world cup race of the season took place at the newly built Penrith Whitewater Stadium, Australia from 30 September to 3 October.

References

External links 
 International Canoe Federation

Canoe Slalom World Cup
1999 in canoeing